Munder Sharma was an Indian politician. He was elected to the Lok Sabha, lower house of the Parliament of India from the Jabalpur constituency of Madhya Pradesh  as a member of the Indian National Congress.

References

External links
Official biographical sketch in Parliament of India website

Lok Sabha members from Madhya Pradesh
India MPs 1980–1984
Indian National Congress politicians
1922 births
1982 deaths
Indian National Congress politicians from Madhya Pradesh